Diah Permatasari (born 5 May 1990 in Probolinggo) is an Indonesian fencer.  She competed in the individual sabre event at the 2012 Summer Olympics and was eliminated in the round of 32 by Mariel Zagunis.

References

1990 births
Living people
People from Probolinggo
Sportspeople from East Java
Indonesian female sabre fencers
Fencers at the 2012 Summer Olympics
Olympic fencers of Indonesia
Fencers at the 2010 Asian Games
Fencers at the 2014 Asian Games
Fencers at the 2018 Asian Games
Southeast Asian Games gold medalists for Indonesia
Southeast Asian Games silver medalists for Indonesia
Southeast Asian Games bronze medalists for Indonesia
Southeast Asian Games medalists in fencing
Competitors at the 2011 Southeast Asian Games
Asian Games competitors for Indonesia
Competitors at the 2019 Southeast Asian Games
20th-century Indonesian women
21st-century Indonesian women